The boys' doubles tournament of the 2015 Badminton Asia Junior Championships was held from July 1 to 5. The defending champions of the last edition were the Chinese pair Huang Kaixiang and Zheng Siwei. This time Zheng Siwei teamed-up with He Jiting (the 2nd seeded) claim the title after upset their teammates Han Chengkai and Zhou Haodong in the finals in the rubber games with the score 21–19, 18–21, 21–19.

Seeded

 Choi Jong-woo / Seo Seung-jae (second round)
 He Jiting / Zheng Siwei (champion)
 Andika Ramadiansyah / Rinov Rivaldy (second round)
 Lee Hong-sub / Lim Su-min (semi final)
 Yahya Adi Kumara / Yantoni Edy Saputra (third round)
 Arjun Madathil Ramachandran / Chirag Shetty (quarter final)
 Muhammad Fachrikar / Muhammad Reza Pahlevi Isfahani (second round)
 Po Li-wei / Yang Ming-tse (third round)

Draw

Finals

Top half

Section 1

Section 2

Section 3

Section 4

Bottom half

Section 5

Section 6

Section 7

Section 8

References

External links 
Main Draw

2015 Badminton Asia Junior Championships